The following is a list of events, births, and deaths in 1852 in Switzerland.

Incumbents 
Federal Council:
Ulrich Ochsenbein 
Jonas Furrer (President)
Josef Munzinger 
Henri Druey 
Friedrich Frey-Herosé
Wilhelm Matthias Naeff 
Stefano Franscini

Events 
 Rayon IV stamps are abandoned and become part of Rayon III
 A treaty is reached between the government of Baden and the Swiss Confederation on how to build Basel Badischer Bahnhof
 Alfred Escher, among others, helps push through a railway law saying that railway construction and operation should be left to private companies
 Lavey-Morcles is created by a merger of Morcles and Lavey

Births 
 June 2 - Eduard Spelterini, pioneer of ballooning and aerial photography (d. 1931)
 June 28 - Hans Huber, composer (d. 1921)
 July 31 - Hans Renold, engineer (d. 1943)
 August 11 - Friedrich Gottlieb Stebler, agriculturalist and ethnographer (d. 1935)
 October 14 - Otto Binswanger, psychiatrist and neurologist (d. 1929)
 December 11 - Karl Moor, Communist and German spy in World War I (d. 1932)

Deaths 
 François-Louis Cailler, first Swiss chocolate producer (b. 1796)

References 

 
Years of the 19th century in Switzerland